Norcross High School is a public high school in Norcross, Georgia, United States, part of the Gwinnett County School System, and serving the cities of Norcross and Peachtree Corners. The school's mascot is the Blue Devil.

The school is also the first in the Gwinnett County Public School System to offer the IB Diploma Programme, first implemented in 1999.

History

Twentieth century
Municipal bonds were issued for a new modern brick schoolhouse in 1903, and another bond issue approved an additional school in 1914.  These buildings stood side by side on College Street for many years in the center of Norcross and were preceded by an old wooden building at the same site.  Before this older wooden school was destroyed, it became very unsteady.

After the second red-brick building was constructed as a grammar school, the first building became Norcross High School.  Both of the brick schools were demolished several years ago, although the first building was in use until 1970.

According to a booklet compiled in 1923 and recently reprinted, the rural schools surrounding Norcross were Beaver Ruin with 60 students, Glover with 172, Mechanicsville School with 87, and Pittman with 60.  Crabapple School, which was located at Pinckneyville, had apparently closed earlier.

In 1933, a report printed in Flanigan's History, Volume I stated, "Norcross has three buildings valued at $60,000, and used thirteen teachers.  For many years this has been one of the best schools in the county and is accredited first class."  A school for black children was located near Hopewell Baptist Church at that time, according to Clara Nesbit.

"Norcross Elementary School" was built in 1939, and the Board of Trustees of the Norcross Consolidated School System listed on the cornerstone were H. L. Sudderth, J. Howard Webb, B. F. Summerour, B. W. Westbrook and C. A. Garner.  This school is still in use, although many additions have been built through the years.  With the completion of the new elementary school, the two older buildings "on the hill" became Norcross High School.

When West Gwinnett High School was built in 1957, parents of Duluth students objected to consolidation and fought successfully to have a new high school built in Duluth. The citizens of Norcross later asked to have the name West Gwinnett changed back to Norcross High School.

The school colors, blue and white, and the school mascot, the Blue Devil, were chosen by the students in 1957 when football was played as a school sport for the first time.

Present day

Norcross High School opened a  facility at 5300 Spalding Drive in Norcross in August 2001.  This land was purchased by the Gwinnett County Public School System as the 1998 Dunwoody tornado cleared the land of trees.  The new building shared the same design as its Gwinnett County neighbor, Peachtree Ridge High School.

The former facility at 2595 Beaver Ruin Road was renamed the Buchanan High School of Technology, which until July 2013 housed the Gwinnett Online Campus and GIVE Center West, a grade 6-12 alternative school. In January 2013, the Gwinnett County Board of Education voted to move GIVE and the online center to a new location, and the original Norcross High School was demolished. All existing buildings with the exception of the 1996 gymnasium  were removed making way for the relocated Summerour Middle School, which opened for the 2015–2016 school year. The previous Summerour building had been next to the old NHS, and was itself torn down to make way for the new Baldwin Elementary.

The school opened with a student population of 2,400, and as of 2015 had an estimated 4,000, one of the largest high schools in the state. It has since slightly decreased since the opening of nearby Paul Duke STEM High School in the 2018–2019 school year, which opened in part to relieve overcrowding at Norcross.

Athletics
Norcross competes in Region 7-AAAAAAA. The school's mascot is the Blue Devil.  The school competes in football, baseball, softball, lacrosse, track and field, cross country, swimming and diving, wrestling, golf, soccer, tennis, volleyball, marching band, and competitive cheerleading.

Norcross varsity boys' basketball team won the Class AAAAA Georgia state championship in 2006, 2007, 2008 and 2011, and the Class AAAAAA state championship 2013 and 2022.  The girls won the basketball state championship in 2010,  2011, and 2022.

The Norcross football team won the 2012 and 2013 state championships.

Notable alumni
 Al-Farouq Aminu, NBA basketball player
 Jeff Backus, former NFL football player
 Brandon Boston Jr., NBA basketball player
 Brice Butler, NFL football player
 Jake Camarda, NFL football player
 Lorenzo Carter, NFL football player
 Jason Croom, NFL football player
 Geremy Davis, NFL football player
 Diamond DeShields,  WNBA basketball player
 Max Garcia, NFL football player
 Brandon Goodwin, NBA basketball player
 Larry Grant, former NFL football player
 Chris Herndon, NFL football player
 Alvin Kamara, NFL football player
 Jeremy Lamb, NBA basketball player
 Gani Lawal, former NBA basketball player
 Chandler Massey, actor
 Jodie Meeks, NBA basketball player
 JT Thor, NBA basketball player
 Lajon Witherspoon, lead singer of Sevendust

Other programs 
In 1996, Norcross High School's band received the Legion of Honor award from the John Philip Sousa Foundation

References

External links
Norcross High School

Public high schools in Georgia (U.S. state)
Schools in Gwinnett County, Georgia
1903 establishments in Georgia (U.S. state)
Educational institutions established in 1903